Leucaena involucrata is a species of flowering plant in the family Fabaceae. It is endemic to Sonora state in northwestern Mexico.

References

involucrata
Endemic flora of Mexico
Flora of Sonora
Endangered plants
Endangered biota of Mexico
Taxonomy articles created by Polbot